Elvaston is a small village and civil parish in Derbyshire, England. The parish also includes two hamlets, Ambaston and Thulston, and a modern housing estate, Boulton Moor. The population of the civil parish taken at the 2011 Census was 1,801. 

Located to the south-east of Derby, Elvaston itself is dominated by Elvaston Castle, a country house which is currently in the ownership of Derbyshire County Council, who plan to lease the site to a private company. The move has proved controversial, attracting a petition of 60,000 signatures against the proposals collected by the Elvaston Castle Estate Trust, who want to keep the site in public ownership. At the present time the Castle is rarely open to the public and has been somewhat neglected, while the grounds are open throughout the summer.

St Bartholomew's Church, Elvaston is a Grade I listed building that dates from the 13th century.

History
In 1086, the Domesday Book says:
”The land of Geoffrey Alselin In Alvaston and Ambaston Thulston and Elvaston Toki had ten carucates of land to the geld. There Geoffrey Alselin has now two ploughs in  demesne; and a certain knight of his one plough. There 32 villans have 15 ploughs. TRE worth twelve pounds now ten pounds. “

Notable residents
 Anthony Blackwall was a vicar here
 William Stanhope, 1st Earl of Harrington 1683–1756
 John Buller (1823–1967), was born here
 Geoffrey S. Dawes, physiologist lived in Thurleston Grange as a boy
 William Darwin Fox, introduced his second cousin Charles Darwin to the study of insects, was born near here in 1805

Ambaston

The hamlet of Ambaston is located about one mile east of Elvaston close to the River Derwent.

Thulston

The hamlet of Thulston is immediately south of Elvaston on the B5010 road. The Harrington Arms is the only public house in the parish and is a local landmark in Thulston.

See also
Listed buildings in Elvaston, Derbyshire

References

External links

 
 
 

Villages in Derbyshire
Civil parishes in Derbyshire
South Derbyshire District